The Gamble Building and Miner's Bean Kettle in Big Oak Flat, California was listed on the National Register of Historic Places in 1991.

It is located at 17544 California State Route 120.

A one-room jail is attached to its northwest corner.

The Miner's Bean Kettle, built around 1870, was a woodframe building attached to the south wall of the jail; it had been used as a residence, post office, and restaurant. The Bean Kettle was dismantled in 2014 by its owner, the Southern Tuolumne County Historical Society, on approval of the Tuolumne County Board of Supervisors. It had deteriorated beyond repair and was no longer safe to enter. The Society preserved the pieces of the demolished Bean Kettle for use in a reconstruction or a historical display.

References

Jails in California
National Register of Historic Places in Tuolumne County, California
Italianate architecture in California
Buildings and structures completed in 1852